The Dora di Bardonecchia is a short tributary of the Dora Riparia river, lying entirely within the upper Susa Valley in the Metropolitan City of Turin, Piedmont, Italy.

Geography 
It originates just outside Bardonecchia from the confluence of mountain streams from the valleys of Rochemolles, Frejus, Rho, and Valle Stretta.

Several major road and rail lines run parallel to the river: the A32 motorway from Torino to Bardonecchia; state highway SS535, Strada Statale di Bardonecchia; the international double-track Fréjus railway, the main line of the Rome-Torino-Paris run.

Notes

Other projects

Rivers of the Alps
Rivers of the Province of Turin
Rivers of Italy
Bardonecchia